Schleiferiaceae is a family of bacteria in the order Flavobacteriales.

References

Flavobacteria
Bacteria families